Chaetolopha leucophragma is a moth in the family Geometridae. It is found in Australia (Queensland, New South Wales, Victoria and Tasmania).

The wings are brown with three pale zigzag lines across the forewings and a white dash near the apex. The hindwings are paler brown with a dark zigzag line.

The larvae probably feed on Polypodiophyta species.

References

Moths described in 1891
Larentiinae
Moths of Australia